Peter or Pete Stewart may refer to:

Peter Stewart (athlete) (born 1947), British middle-distance runner
Peter Stewart (cricketer) (1730–1796), English cricketer
Peter A. Stewart (1921–1993), Canadian physiologist
Peter G. Stewart (1809–1900), American pioneer
Pete Stewart, American singer and songwriter
Pete Stewart (racing driver) (born 1931), retired NASCAR Cup series driver
Peter Stewart (Medal of Honor) (1858–1914), USMC gunnery sergeant awarded the Medal of Honor during the Boxer Rebellion
Peter Stewart (politician), American politician in New Jersey
Sam Newfield (1889–1964), American film director often credited as Peter Stewart

See also
Peter Stuart, American singer-songwriter